Walter Sutton (born 15 October 1932) is a Canadian sprinter. He competed in the men's 100 metres at the 1952 Summer Olympics.

References

1932 births
Living people
Athletes (track and field) at the 1952 Summer Olympics
Canadian male sprinters
Olympic track and field athletes of Canada
Place of birth missing (living people)